Richard Lee Lawson (born March 7, 1947) is an American actor who has starred in movies and on television. He is perhaps best known for his roles in genre films; he portrayed Ryan in the 1982 film Poltergeist, and Dr. Ben Taylor in the 1983 NBC miniseries V.

Life and career
Born Rickey Lee Lawson in Loma Linda, California, Lawson was drafted into the United States Army and became a medic. He served 21 months in Vietnam during the Vietnam War and was wounded in action. After completing his military duty, he embarked on an acting career. His first feature film role (uncredited) was that of a gay man targeted for murder in the classic 1971 movie Dirty Harry. In 1973, he played Willis in Scream Blacula Scream. His other well known roles include the 1979 movie The Main Event, and the 1984 drama Streets of Fire, where he played Officer Ed Price. Lawson's first ongoing starring role in a television series was in Australian drama Hotel Story in 1977, however, that series was cancelled before the first episode aired. He later starred in the 1980s series Chicago Story; he took the ongoing role of Nick Kimball on the prime time soap opera Dynasty from 1986 to 1987, appeared in The Days and Nights of Molly Dodd as Detective Nathaniel Hawthorne from 1989 to 1991, and was in the day time soap opera All My Children as Lucas Barnes from 1992 to 1994. Lawson has made many guest appearances on television, including roles on Kojak, Get Christie Love!, Sister, Sister, Soul Food, The Bernie Mac Show, The Division and Strong Medicine.

Personal life
Lawson was married to his first wife, actress Denise Gordy, from New Year's Eve 1978 until 1989. They have one daughter, actress Bianca Lawson, born in 1979. Lawson also has a son named Ricky, born in 1992. On March 22, 1992, Lawson survived the USAir Flight 405 plane crash, after take-off from LaGuardia Airport, in Queens, New York City. During the summer of 2013, he began dating Tina Knowles, fashion designer and mother of singers Beyoncé and Solange Knowles. Lawson and Knowles had known each other for over 30 years, as she was the best friend of his late sister. As a result, Lawson stated that he had "always admired her from afar and up close too." The couple married on April 12, 2015.

Filmography

Film

Television

References

External links
 Official website
 

1947 births
Living people
Male actors from California
American male film actors
United States Army personnel of the Vietnam War
American male soap opera actors
People from Loma Linda, California
Survivors of aviation accidents or incidents
African-American male actors
American male television actors
United States Army soldiers
20th-century African-American people
21st-century African-American people